The Pakistan national cricket team toured Sri Lanka in March and April 2006 to play two Test matches and three ODIs. Pakistan won the Test series 1–0 with 1 match drawn.

Test series summary

First Test

Second Test

ODI series

Pakistan won the three-match ODI series 2–0 with 1st ODI match abandoned due to rain.

1st ODI

2nd ODI

3rd ODI

References

External links
 Pakistan in Sri Lanka ODI Series, 2005/06
 Pakistan in Sri Lanka Test Series, 2005/06

2006 in Pakistani cricket
2006 in Sri Lankan cricket
International cricket competitions in 2005–06
2005–06
Sri Lankan cricket seasons from 2000–01